In the Battle of Shaizar in 1111, a Crusader army commanded by King Baldwin I of Jerusalem and a Seljuk army led by Mawdud ibn Altuntash of Mosul fought to a tactical draw, but a withdrawal of Crusader forces.

Background
Beginning in 1110 and lasting until 1115, the Seljuk Sultan Muhammad I in Baghdad launched annual invasions of the Crusader states. The first year's attack on Edessa was repelled. Prodded by the pleas of some citizens of Aleppo and spurred by the Byzantines, the Sultan ordered a major offensive against the Frankish possessions in northern Syria for the year 1111. The Sultan appointed Mawdud ibn Altuntash, governor of Mosul, to command the army. The composite force included contingents from Diyarbakir and Ahlat under Sökmen al-Kutbi, from Hamadan led by Bursuq ibn Bursuq, and from Mesopotamia under Ahmadil and other emirs.

Edessa to Aleppo
At the approach of the large Muslim army, the small Frankish forces of the County of Edessa withdrew within the walls of their two major towns. Although the Seljuks moved with impunity through the lands of the Latin state, they were unable to make an impression on first Edessa and later Turbessel (Tell Bashir). Soon the thwarted Seljuk host moved to Aleppo. At that city, the forces of Damascus led by Toghtekin joined Mawdud's army.

Even though the majority of Aleppo's citizens were well disposed to the Seljuk army, the ruler of the city, Fakhr al-Mulk Radwan refused to open the city's gates. Radwan regarded the Sultan's army as a threat to his authority. Both Bursuq and Sökmen al-Kutbi, were ill and quarreled with each other. When Sukman's health failed, he withdrew from the army with his followers, but died before he got home. Bursuq also quit the army and took his contingent home. Anxious to receive Sukman's territories, Ahmadil left the army to press his claims with the Sultan.

Aleppo to Shaizar
By this time Tancred had called up his Antiochene army and based it at the castle of Rugia near Jisr ash-Shughur, a bridge over the Orontes River about 50 kilometers south of Antioch. Receiving a plea for help from the independent Munqidh rulers of Shaizar, Mawdud's army moved 120 kilometers south-southwest from Aleppo to camp outside that town.

At Tancred's call for assistance, King Baldwin I brought both his own army from the Kingdom of Jerusalem and Count Bertrand's forces from the County of Tripoli. They were joined at Rugia by a contingent from Edessa under Count Baldwin. After uniting their forces, the Crusaders advanced first to the Christian-held town of Afamiya, then toward the Muslim host outside Shaizar.

Battle
Mawdud's army "employed their normal harassing tactics, which were directed to the objects of cutting off supplies from the Franks, and of preventing their watering their horses in the Orontes." The Christian host refused to be provoked into battle, but instead moved in a closed up array. When the Turkish horse archers pressed them too closely, they fought to push them back. Rather than a battle, the action was a constant running skirmish in which the Seljuks failed to stop the advance of Baldwin's army.

The Franks camped near Shaizar but within two weeks they were forced to fall back on Afamiya because the Turks cut off their supplies. During the withdrawal, they were harassed again, but did not allow themselves to be drawn into a pitched battle. At this, Mawdud's warriors, discouraged by their lack of success and plunder, dispersed for home.

The future poet and diplomat Usamah ibn Munqidh, then 16 years old, was a participant in the battle, and later reminisced about it in his Kitab al-I'tibar.

Results
This drawn battle, really a running skirmish, allowed King Baldwin I and Tancred to successfully defend the Principality of Antioch. No Crusader towns or castles fell to the Seljuk Turks during the campaign. The next major action in northern Syria was the Battle of Sarmin in 1115.

Footnotes

References
 Smail, R. C. Crusading Warfare 1097-1193. New York: Barnes & Noble Books, (1956) 1995. 

Battles involving the Seljuk Empire
Conflicts in 1111
1111 in Asia
12th century in the Seljuk Empire
Shaizar
Shaizar
1110s in the Kingdom of Jerusalem